In fiber-optic communication, an intramodal dispersion, is a category of dispersion that occurs within a single mode optical fiber. This dispersion mechanism is a result of material properties of optical fiber and applies to both single-mode and multi-mode fibers. Two distinct types of intramodal dispersion are: chromatic dispersion and polarization mode dispersion.

Chromatic dispersion
In silica, the index of refraction is dependent upon wavelength. Therefore different wavelengths will travel down an optical fiber at different velocities. This implies that a pulse with a wider FWHM will spread more than a pulse with a narrower FWHM. This dispersion limits both the bandwidth and the distance over which the information can be transmitted. This is why for long communications links, it is desirable to use a laser with a very narrow linewidth. Distributed Feedback Lasers (DFB) are popular for communications because they have a single longitudinal mode with a very narrow line width.

See also
Dispersion (optics)

References

Fiber optics